Mahoney v Ashton was a slavery case brought before the General Court of the Western Shore in Annapolis, Maryland in 1791. On October 18, 1791 enslaved man Charles Mahoney filed a petition for freedom before the court against his owner, Father John Ashton, a Roman Catholic priest and former Jesuit. 

Mahoney claimed that he was descended from a free woman named Ann Joice, an indentured servant, making him a free man. Mahoney v. Ashton dragged on for twelve years, including three jury trials and two appeal hearings. The result was inconclusive, but on the 4th of May 1804 John Ashton recorded a deed that "forever set free Charles Mahoney.", and agreed to "relinquish and renounce all claim whatever which I have or ever had to him."

The case involved hundreds of participants including many notable members of the Maryland slave-owning gentry, including Charles Carroll of Carrollton.

See also
Somerset v Stewart, aka Somersett's case

References
Mahoney v Ashton at msa.maryland.gov; Gibson, Papenfeuse, Race & the Law in Maryland Retrieved 21 August 2018
Mahoney v Ashton at earlywashingtondc.org Retrieved 21 August 2018

External links
Mahoney v Ashton at earlywashingtondc.org Retrieved 21 August 2018
Mahoney v Ashton at racism.org Retrieved 21 August 2018

1799 in United States case law
United States slavery case law
Abolitionism in the United States